A streetcar, street car, or tram is a vehicle that travels on rails, typically in a street.

This may also refer to:

Transport 
 Light rail vehicles may also travel on streets 
 Heritage streetcar, contemporary streetcar lines that use old-fashioned streetcars
 Wright StreetCar, a bus designed to have a tram-like appearance
 Streetcar (carsharing), the UK car club acquired by Zipcar in 2010

Music 
 "Street Car", a song by Canadian musician Hayden from his 2002 album Skyscraper National Park
 "Streetcar (song)", a song by Funeral for a Friend from their 2005 album Hours
 "Streetcar (Daniel Caesar song)", a song by Daniel Caesar from his 2015 extended play Pilgrim's Paradise

See also
 Ford StreetKa
 A Streetcar Named Desire (disambiguation), a play by Tennessee Williams and several adaptations

ja:路面電車